On 24 January 1974, a Togo Air Force Douglas C-47 Skytrain carrying several notable political figures crashed at an isolated location near the village of Sarakawa in northern Togo. Gnassingbé Eyadéma, the President of Togo, was on board the aircraft, which was flying from Lomé to his native village, Pya. As the C-47 descended for landing, it crashed near Sarakawa. Eyadéma survived, but claimed his French pilot and all three other passengers died.

Eyadéma claimed the aircraft had been sabotaged after he had reneged on an agreement with a French company over the use of a phosphate mine. Eyadéma attributed his survival to mystical powers and declared 24 January to be "Economic Liberation Day." Eyadéma even changed his first name from Étienne to Gnassingbé to remember the date of the day he survived the crash.

Following the incident, a monument was established by the Togolese government near the crash site. The monument features a statue of Eyadéma standing on a plinth, flanked by images of his generals who died in the crash.

Eyadéma was not the sole survivor of the crash, but he deliberately misrepresented the details of the accident to make himself look like a hero with superhuman strength who miraculously survived the disaster when everyone else was killed. His C-47 was replaced by a new presidential jet, a Gulfstream II (registered as 5V-TAA) which was itself damaged beyond repair in a crash on 26 December of the same year, which killed three members of the crew, but which all three of the passengers on board survived. Eyadéma was not on board the jet at the time.

References

Accidents and incidents involving the Douglas C-47 Skytrain
Aviation accidents and incidents in 1974
Aviation accidents and incidents in Togo
Aviation accidents and incidents involving state leaders
January 1974 events in Africa
Plane crash